The Fosdyke Saga was a British comic strip by cartoonist Bill Tidy, published in the Daily Mirror newspaper from March 1971 - February 1985. Described as "a classic tale of struggle, power, personalities and tripe", the strip was a parody of John Galsworthy's classic novel series The Forsyte Saga. However, the slightly bizarre and strange antics of the characters and those around them had a Lancashire/Cheshire lean, with mangles, chimneys and soot ever-present.

Plot

The Fosdyke Saga was the story of Roger Ditchley, a wastrel son of a tripe magnate, Old Ben Ditchley, who was deliberately disinherited by his father in favour of Jos Fosdyke. Roger, blinded by rage, seeks to regain his rightful inheritance over the next twelve years. His wicked plans are always thwarted, as he enlists the most inept allies and twisted methods to attain his goal.

The Fosdykes themselves pursue the tripe business in various ways, such as selling alcoholic tripe in the United States during Prohibition. The many Fosdyke children grow up and have adventures of their own, including joining the Royal Flying Corps during World War I.

Each book included bizarre settings, such as the rugby game between a Welsh choir and a lady's casual rugby team held in a Salford hotel (the stairs collapsed in the first half), the hunt for the Tripe Naughtee and the unforgettable "Brain of Salford" competition.

Production
Created and drawn by well-known cartoonist Bill Tidy, who also produced cartoons for the satirical magazine Private Eye and created The Cloggies, the wry humour in this classic 1970s comic strip was very popular, if often unintelligible to those outside of the mid-north-west of England.

Cancellation

The series was axed from the Daily Mirror in 1985, the year after tycoon Robert Maxwell had purchased Mirror Group Newspapers.

Adaptations
The Fosdyke Saga has been adapted as a TV series (starring Roger Sloman and Sherrie Hewson), a radio serial by the BBC and a stage play.

The radio adaptation starred (among others) Miriam Margolyes, Enn Reitel, Christian Rodska and David Threlfall.

External links
Gallery of The Fosdyke Saga books

Fosdyke Saga radio serial
Autobiography of Bill Tidy

1971 comics debuts
1985 comics endings
Comics characters introduced in 1971
British comic strips
Humor comics
Fictional families
British comics characters
Parody comics
Parodies of literature
Comics adapted into plays
Comics adapted into radio series
British comics adapted into films
The Forsyte Saga
Comics set during World War I
Comics set in the 1920s
Comics set in the United Kingdom
Comics set in the United States
Works about prohibition in the United States